Maixabel is a 2021 Spanish drama film directed by Icíar Bollaín and co-written by Bollaín and Isa Campo. The film stars Blanca Portillo and Luis Tosar alongside Bruno Sevilla, Urko Olazabal and María Cerezuela and is based on the true story of Maixabel Lasa, a woman whose husband, Juan María Jáuregui, was killed by ETA, a Basque separatist group, and who receives an invitation to talk with the killers of her husband eleven years after.

Plot
Maixabel Lasa loses her husband, Juan María Jáuregui, in 2000 at the hands of the ETA.
She later becomes director of the Basque office for terrorism victims.
Jáuregui's killers have been sentenced to prison where they start to reject violence.
Eleven years later, she receives an invitation for an interview from one of the killers of her husband, who is serving his sentence in a jail at Nanclares de la Oca in Álava, after cutting his ties with the terrorist group. Despite doubts and immense pain, Maixabel accepts the invitation and comes face to face with the man who took her husband's life.

Cast

Production
The concept for the film came from the producers, Koldo Zuazua and Juan Moreno, who received a proposal to tell the story of Maixabel Lasa alongside screenwriter Isa Campo in 2018. The film was produced by Kowalski Films and FeelGood, and it had the participation of EiTB, TVE, and Movistar+, support from ICAA, the Basque Government, and the collaboration of the Gipuzkoa Film Commission. It was shot in various locations of Gipuzkoa and Álava in the Basque Country, Spain. The music for the film was composed by Alberto Iglesias, Javier Agirre Erauso was the cinematographer and Mikel Serrano was the production designer, other credits includes Alazne Ameztoy (sound), Clara Bilbao (costumes), Karmele Soler (make-up), Sergio Pérez (hairsytling) and Nacho Ruiz Capillas (editing).

Release
The film screened at the 69th San Sebastián International Film Festival of 2021. Distributed by Buena Vista International, it was released in cinemas in Spain on September 24, 2021.

Reception
On review aggregator website Rotten Tomatoes, the film holds an approval rating of 100% based on 6 reviews, with an average rating of 7.30. Juan Pando of Fotogramas rated the film four out of five stars writing that "Bollaín demonstrates a masterful command of her craft in this, her most well-rounded film". Jonathan Holland from Screendaily commented that the film is "a beautifully judged and sensitive exploration of the emotional fallout of terrorism".

Accolades  

|-
| align = "center" rowspan = "5" | 2021 || rowspan = "5" | 27th Forqué Awards || colspan = "2" | Best Film ||  || rowspan = "5" | 
|-
| Best Film Actress || Blanca Portillo || 
|-
| rowspan = "2" | Best Film Actor || Luis Tosar || 
|-
| Urko Olazabal || 
|-
| colspan = "2" | Cinema and Education in Values || 
|-
| align = "center" rowspan = "44" | 2022 || rowspan="8"| 9th Feroz Awards
| Best Drama Film
| Koldo Zuazua, Juan Moreno, Guillermo Sempere
| 
| rowspan="8"|
|-
| Best Director
| Icíar Bollaín
| 
|-
| Best Actor (film)
| Luis Tosar
| 
|-
| Best Actress (film)
| Blanca Portillo
| 
|-
| Best Supporting Actor (film)
| Urko Olazabal
| 
|-
| Best Screenplay
| Isa Campo, Icíar Bollaín
| 
|-
| Best Original Soundtrack
| Alberto Iglesias
| 
|-
| Best Trailer
| Rafa Martínez
| 
|-
| rowspan = "8" | 77th CEC Medals || colspan = "2" | Best Film ||  || rowspan = "8" | 
|-
| Best Director || Icíar Bollaín || 
|-
| Best Actor || Luis Tosar || 
|-
| Best Actress || Blanca Portillo || 
|-
| Best Supporting Actor || Urko Olazábal || 
|-
| Best Original Screenplay || Icíar Bollaín, Isa Campo || 
|-
| Best Editing || Nacho Ruiz Capillas || 
|-
| Best Score || Alberto Iglesias || 
|-
| rowspan="14"|36th Goya Awards 
| Best Film
| Maixabel
| 
| rowspan="14"|
|-
| Best Director
| Icíar Bollaín
| 
|-
| Best Actor
| Luis Tosar
| 
|-
| Best Actress
| Blanca Portillo
| 
|-
| Best Supporting Actor
| Urko Olazabal
| 
|-
| Best New Actress
| María Cerezuela
| 
|-
| Best Original Screenplay
| Icíar Bolláin, Isa Campo
| 
|-
| Best Original Score
| Alberto Iglesias
| 
|-
| Best Editing
| Nacho Ruiz Capillas
| 
|-
| Best Art Direction
| Mikel Serrano
| 
|-
| Best Production Supervision
| Guadalupe Balaguer Trelles
| 
|-
| Best Sound
| Alazne Ameztoy, Juan Ferro, Candela Palencia
| 
|-
| Best Costume Design
| Clara Bilbao
| 
|-
| Best Makeup and Hairstyles
| Karmele Soler, Sergio Pérez Berbel
| 
|-
| rowspan = "4" | 30th Actors and Actresses Union Awards || Best Film Actress in a Leading Role || Blanca Portillo ||  || rowspan = "4" | 
|-
| Best Film Actor in a Leading Role || Luis Tosar || 
|-
| Best Film Actor in a Secondary Role || Urko Olazabal || 
|-
| Best Film Actress in a Minor Role || Arantxa Aranguren || 
|-
| Spanish Screenwriters' Union Awards || Best Screenplay in a Drama Feature Film || Isa Campo, Icíar Bollaín ||  || 
|-
| rowspan = "8" | 9th Platino Awards || colspan = "2" | Best Ibero-American Film ||  || rowspan = "8" | 
|-
| Best Director || Icíar Bollaín || 
|-
| Best Screenplay || Isa Campo, Icíar Bollaín || 
|-
| Best Actress || Blanca Portillo || 
|-
| Best Actor || Luis Tosar || 
|-
| Best Supporting Actor || Urko Olazabal || 
|-
| Best Editing || Nacho Ruiz Capillas || 
|-
| colspan = "2" | Cinema and Education in Values ||  
|}

See also 
 List of Spanish films of 2021

References

External links
 

Spanish drama films
Films directed by Icíar Bollaín
Buena Vista International films
Kowalski Films films
Films shot in the Basque Country (autonomous community)
2020s Spanish-language films
Films scored by Alberto Iglesias
Films set in the Basque County
2020 drama films
Films about ETA (separatist group)
2020s Spanish films